The All-Hockey East Teams are composed of all players from teams that are members of Hockey East, an NCAA Division I hockey-only conference. Each year, from the 1984–85 season onward, at the conclusion of the Hockey East regular season, the head coaches of each team vote for players to be placed on each all-conference team. The First, Second, and Rookie Teams have been named in each ECAC Hockey season, except for 1985–86, in which no Rookie Team was named.

The all-conference teams are composed of one goaltender, two defensemen, and three forwards. If a tie occurs for the final selection of any position, both players are included as part of the greater all-conference team. However, if a tie resulted in an increase in the number of superior all-stars, the inferior team would not be reduced in number, which happened in the 1985–86 and 2009–10 seasons. Players may only appear once per year on any of the first or second teams, but freshman may appear on both the rookie team and one of the other all-conference teams in a single year. While many freshmen have wound up on the Second Team, only eight, Brian Leetch, Paul Kariya, Jon Gillies, Jack Eichel, Cayden Primeau, Devon Levi, Scott Morrow, and Lane Hutson have managed to make the First Team. Rob Gaudreau is thus far the only player to appear on the All-Star teams in more than one position, forward and defense.

From the 1994–95 through the 1995–97 seasons, no distinction was made between a first or second team, and all players were listed as part of an All-Star team. The Rookie Team was known as the 'Freshman Team' until the 1989–90 season.

Six Hockey East teams were members of ECAC Hockey until the end of the 1983–84 season, while Vermont became a Hockey East member in 2005–06. Additional conference expansion in the 2010s has seen Notre Dame join Hockey East in the 2013–14 season and Connecticut in the 2014–15 season.

In 2016–17, Hockey East expanded the all-star voting to include a Third team.

All-conference teams

First Team

1980s

1990s

2000s

2010s

2020s

First Team players by school

First Team players by school (including ECAC Appearances)

Multiple appearances

Second Team

1980s

1990s

2000s

2010s

2020s

Second Team players by school

Second Team players by school (including ECAC Appearances)

Multiple appearances

Third Team

2010s

2020s

Third Team players by school

Multiple appearances

Rookie Team

1980s

1990s

2000s

2010s

2020s

Rookie Team players by school

See also
Hockey East Awards
All-ECAC Hockey Teams

References

General

Specific 

College ice hockey trophies and awards in the United States